The following highways are numbered 746:

Costa Rica
 National Route 746

United States
 Georgia State Route 746 (former)
  Louisiana Highway 746
 Maryland Route 746
  Ohio State Route 746
  Puerto Rico Highway 746